Exchange may refer to:

Physics
Gas exchange is the movement of oxygen and carbon dioxide molecules from a region of higher concentration to a region of lower concentration.

Places

United States
 Exchange, Indiana, an unincorporated community
 Exchange, Missouri, an unincorporated community
 Exchange, Pennsylvania, an unincorporated community
 Exchange, West Virginia, an unincorporated community

Elsewhere
 Exchange Alley, in London, United Kingdom
 Exchange District, a historic area in Winnipeg, Manitoba, Canada

Business and economy
Bureau de change, a business whose customers exchange one currency for another
Cryptocurrency exchange, a business that allows customers to trade cryptocurrencies or digital currencies.
Digital currency exchangers (a.k.a. DCEs or Bitcoin exchanges), businesses that allow customers to trade digital currencies for other assets, such as conventional fiat money, or different digital currencies
Exchange (economics)
Exchange (organized market)
Exchange rate (a.k.a. foreign exchange rate), the price for which one currency is exchanged for another
Foreign exchange company, a broker that offers currency exchange and international payments
Foreign exchange controls, controls imposed by a government on the purchase/sale of foreign currencies
Foreign exchange market (a.k.a. forex, FX, or currency market), a global decentralized market where one currency is exchanged for another
Foreign-exchange reserves, holdings of other countries' currencies
Foreign exchange risk, arises from the change in price of one currency against another
Trade, the exchange of goods or services for money or other goods or services

Military
Post exchange (a.k.a. "PX" or base exchange), a retail store operated by Army and Air Force Exchange Service on US military installations worldwide; originally akin to trading posts, they now resemble contemporary department stores or strip malls. 
 Prisoner exchange
 , an American Civil War steamer

Technology
 .exchange, an ICANN-era generic Internet top-level domain
 Internet exchange point (IX), physical infrastructure connecting Internet service providers' networks
 Microsoft Exchange (disambiguation)
 Telephone exchange, a system that connects telephone calls

Art, entertainment, and media

Games
 Exchange (chess), closely related or sequential captures of pieces of both players in a chess game
The exchange (chess), a specific type of exchange where a player exchanges a minor piece for an opponent's rook

Music
 Exchange (song), a 2015 song by Bryson Tiller
 Exchange, a new-age/atmospheric instrumental band composed of Steve Sexton and Gerald O'Brien and also their 1992 self-titled album 
 Exchange (album), a 1999 split EP by the punk bands Against All Authority and The Criminals
 "Exchange" or "(Exchange)", two songs on Massive Attack's Mezzanine (album)

Film
 Exchange (film), 2015 South Korean crime thriller
 Exchanged (film), 2019 Peruvian fantasy comedy

Other uses
 Cultural exchange
 Student exchange program

See also 
 Columbian exchange
 The Exchange (disambiguation)
 Exchange Building (disambiguation)
 Exchange Hotel (disambiguation)
 Interchange (disambiguation)
 X-Change (disambiguation)